Sandra "Sandie" Crisp (January 13, 1960 – January 27, 2021), better known by her stage name The Goddess Bunny, was an American entertainer, drag queen, actor, and model. Footage of Crisp tap dancing, originally recorded around 1987, was the subject of one of the first viral videos.

Life and career
Sandie Crisp was born on January 13, 1960, in Santa Monica, California, to John Wesley Baima, an Italian lawyer, and Betty Baima, a half-Cherokee secretary. Much of what is known of Crisp's life comes from her own retellings of events, some of which were fabricated. For instance, in 2018, Crisp claimed to have participated in the first Paralympic Games in 1974, but no such event took place that year in Los Angeles, where Crisp was based at the time.

Crisp was a transgender woman, transitioning in the late 1970s. She performed as a drag queen during evenings. After meeting fellow drag queen Glen Meadmore on the set of Hollywood Vice Squad, Crisp would become his friend and collaborator.

She contracted polio soon after birth. Crisp was subject to the malpractice of multiple doctors resulting in the further disfigurement of her body. Crisp used a wheelchair throughout her life.
Crisp lived in various foster homes for disabled children following the divorce of her parents. She routinely endured physical and sexual abuse from members of her foster care families largely due to her gender identity and disability. Crisp returned to her mother's home during her teens, coming out as a trans woman aged 14. Her mother was deeply religious and rejected her gender identity, insisting on calling Crisp by her birth name, although Crisp would return to live with her mother at times during her adult life.

Crisp began pursuing a career in the entertainment industry immediately after graduating from high school. She made her acting debut as Charlean in the 1986 film Hollywood Vice Squad. She later made an appearance in the music video for "The Dope Show" by Marilyn Manson. Crisp claims she was "paid nothing from the start" for her roles in music videos.

In 1994, she was the subject of a documentary titled The Goddess Bunny, directed by Nick Bougas. Another documentary about Crisp, titled Bunny and made by Hunter Ray Barker, was released in 2019. The film is based in the assisted living facility Crisp resided in during her later years, and features fans of Crisp including Gene Simmons.

The Louvre has The Goddess Bunny as Leda (1986), a nude photo of Crisp taken by Joel-Peter Witkin, as part of its permanent collection.

Personal life 
Although Bunny had no biological children of her own, she informally 'adopted' fans including photographer Chuck Grant, who is the sister of pop musician Lana Del Rey.

She reportedly met one of her sons, film director Hunter Ray Barker, in a Mexican restaurant. Crisp acted as a muse for Barker, who made a short documentary film about her.

Death 
Crisp lived in an assisted living facility in Inglewood, California, towards the end of her life. She died of COVID-19 in Los Angeles on January 27, 2021, 14 days after her 61st birthday.

Lana Del Rey posted a tribute to Crisp on her Instagram page. Crisp's son, Hunter Ray Barker, created a GoFundMe appeal to raise money to cover Crisp's funeral expenses, seeking to honour her wish to be buried at the Hollywood Forever Cemetery.

Filmography

Films 

Note

Television credits

Music video credits

References

External links

Goddess Bunny on Instagram
Goddess Bunny on YouTube

1960 births
2021 deaths
20th-century American actresses
21st-century American actresses
Actors with disabilities
Actresses from Santa Monica, California
American film actresses
Deaths from the COVID-19 pandemic in California
Female models from California
American LGBT actors
LGBT culture in Los Angeles 
LGBT people from California
People with HIV/AIDS
People with polio
Transgender actresses
Transgender female models
Candidates in the 2020 United States presidential election
American drag queens
Transgender drag performers